The sixth season (subtitled Fast Forward or Teenage Mutant Ninja Turtles: Fast Forward) originally aired between July 29, 2006 and October 27, 2007, beginning with the "Future Shellshock" episode. The season is lighter in tone and less violent than previous ones, with a greater emphasis on jokes, and includes recreated designs for all returning characters. 

The season was originally going to air one year later, but to try to increase interest in the series, FOX's 4Kids TV started airing this season a year earlier instead of the "Ninja Tribunal" arc. This season became the fifth season to air on commercial television even though it was the sixth season produced. After the scheduling change was made, Mirage and its partners decided to finish production on the "Ninja Tribunal" episodes and release them directly to DVD. 4Kids Entertainment later signed a deal with Comcast and this season began airing on Comcast-On-Demand in August 2006. Thus mass confusion has ensued regarding which season is officially season five and which is season six. Chronologically this season comes after the "Ninja Tribunal" season.

The episodes were released in partial season sets. Volume 1, named "TMNT Fast Forward: Future Shellshock!,” was released on February 6, 2007, and had the first thirteen episodes, and volume 2, named "TMNT Fast Forward: Day of the Awakening,” was released on August 7, 2007, and had the remaining thirteen episodes.

Story
Having suddenly transported 100 years into the future, the Turtles and Splinter arrive in the year 2105, where they befriend Cody Jones, heir to a vast tech company called O'Neil Tech and the great-grandson of April O'Neil and Casey Jones, and his fussy yet loyal English-accented robotic servant Serling. Due to the multispecies population of New New York City, the Turtles can openly move about and interact with everyday people. As the Turtles and Splinter try to help Cody make a time portal for them to return to the 21st Century, they must uncover the suspicious criminal activities being carried out by Cody's greedy uncle Darius Dun. Aiding Darius is the Inuwashi Gunjin, avian-themed warriors from an endangered species that are initially enslaved by Darius before being freed by the Turtles.

Other enemies the Turtles must contend with are the Kanabo warlord Sh'Okanabo and his sentient computer virus ally Viral, who seek to unleash the "Day of Awakening" on Earth. However, it becomes apparent that a combination of sunlight and Earth's oxygen-based atmosphere is preventing the Kanabo symbiosis from occurring. Darius is eventually presented with the Dark Turtles, ferocious clones of the Turtles created by Sh'Okanabo as minions, in return for the blueprints to the Time Window. Though he manages to create a Time Portal of his own, but goes haywire and opens multiple rifts in time. While dealing with a time-displaced Utrom Shredder, the Turtles neutralize the unstable Time Window and seemingly destroy Sh'Okanabo in the process.

With Darius losing his patience after ultimately being exposed and forced into hiding, Dark Leo attempts to destroy the Turtles from within. However, their kindness touches him enough to start treating the other Dark Turtles the same way. The Turtles eventually learn from President Bishop, a future equivalent of Agent Bishop and president of the Pan Galactic Alliance, that Sh'Okanabo survived his seeming destruction and has escaped to the dark side of the moon, where he has taken over the moon base. Cody, Serling, and President Bishop neutralize Viral using a Decompiler program and prevent Earth from being shrouded in darkness. The Turtles and Splinter manage to eradicate Sh'Okanabo and cure his army, averting the Day of Awakening and saving Earth.

Other notable futuristic enemies and allies include Starlee Hambrath, an O'Neil Tech intern from the planet Omatran; Constable Biggles, a robotic police officer and leader of the Peacekeepers; Jammerhead, an eccentric cyborg thug and leader of the Street Phantoms criminal gang; Torbin Zixx; a charismatic intergalactic smuggler and mercenary; Triple Threat, a three-headed alien wrestler; Boss Zukko, a Triceraton gangster who has a history with Zixx; and a future equivalent of Baxter Stockman, who has been transformed into a cycloptic brain-headed squid-like creature.

Unproduced episodes
Various unproduced episodes of the season would have introduced the Tech Turtles, robotic duplicates of the Turtles created by Darius to replace the Dark Turtles; and future equivalents of characters such as the Utroms, Leatherhead, Usagi, and the Utrom Shredder. Other plots would have included Stockman receiving a new body from President Bishop and standing up to the Utrom Shredder; and the Dark Turtles seeking help from their original counterparts. The Turtles would eventually prioritize reconstruction of the Time Window when Cody mysteriously fluxes out of existence. As Donnie tries very hard to break through to the point where the Turtles and Splinter were initially pulled from, the others battle Darius Dun, the Tech Turtles, and the Utrom Shredder alongside Usagi, Leatherhead, the Utroms, and even the Dark Turtles.

Donnie eventually locates Cody in a subterranean location, tinkering with some kind of high-tech machine and watching various images of the Turtles' future selves. After ultimately defeating their enemies, the Turtles, Splinter, and Serling proceed to rescue Cody only to discover that they have materialized in the Turtles' lair in their home time. Thanks to a crude Time Beacon built by Cody, the Time Window in 2105 can accurately and safely bridge the gap between time periods. With that, the Turtles and Splinter bid farewell to Cody, Serling, and company before returning to their respective times.

Cast 
 Michael Sinterniklaas as Leo: the leader of the Turtles. (26 episodes)
 Sam Riegel as Donnie: the Turtles' genius engineer who is identified as the member who holds the team together. (26 episodes)
 Frank Frankson as Raph: Leo's second-in-command who is stubborn but caring. He hated the future and the technology until he saw a wrestling match since he could go out being seen. He got nicknamed the Turtle Terror for defeating the villain. (26 episodes)
 Wayne Grayson as Mikey: the Turtles' youngest member and a source of comic relief. (26 episodes)

Supporting
 Christopher C. Adams as Cody Jones: the great-grandson of April O'Neil and Casey Jones, who lives in the year 2105 and helps the Turtles survive in the future. (23 episodes)
 Marc Thompson as Serling: Cody's fussy yet loyal English-accented robotic servant who becomes constantly infuriated by the Turtles. (20 episodes)
 Darren Dunstan as Splinter: the Turtles' sensei and adopted father. (18 episodes)

Villains
 Sean Schemmel as Sh'Okonabo: a Kanabo warlord scheming to unleash the "Day of Awakening", when his race bond with and assimilate the inhabitants of a planet before draining its resources to the brink of devastation. (8 episodes)
 Eva Kaminsky as Viral: a sentient computer virus allied with Sh'Okonabo. (6 episodes)
 David Zen Mansley as Darius Dun: Cody's greedy uncle who despises the Turtles. (9 episodes)

Recurring
 Sean Schemmel as Constable Biggles: a robotic police officer and leader of the Peacekeepers. (13 episodes)
 Amanda Brown as Starlee Hambrath: a bright and highly intelligent O'Neil Tech intern from the planet Omatran and Cody's friend who also has feelings for him. (5 episodes)
 Tom Wayland as Jammerhead: an eccentric cyborg thug and leader of the Street Phantoms criminal gang. (4 episodes)
 Shawn Curran as Boss Zukko, a Triceraton gangster who has a history with Zixx.
 David Elliott as Torbin Zixx: a charismatic intergalactic smuggler and mercenary who serves as both an adversary and an ally to the Turtles. (3 episodes)
 David Zen Mansley as
 Bishop: the president of the Pan Galactic Alliance, a federation that controls several galaxies all over the universe. He was formerly a black ops agent in charge of the Earth Protection Force, an organization devoted to defending Earth from alien invasion. (3 episodes)
 Triple Threat Green: the green-skinned, cycloptic middle head of Triple Threat, who has cybernetic parts and acts as the main head of the three-headed alien wrestler. (3 episodes)
 Marc Odgers as Triple Threat Red: the red and grey-skinned right head of Triple Threat, who has dreadlocks and a short temper. (3 episodes)
 Michael Sinterniklaas as  Dark Leo: a Kanabo clone of Leo and the leader of the Dark Turtles. (3 episodes)
 Sam Riegel as
 Dark Donnie: a Kanabo clone of Donnie. (3 episodes)
 Triple Threat Yellow: the yellow-skinned left head of Triple Threat, who has red eyes, a metal chin, and a mischievous personality. (3 episodes)
 Frank Frankson as Dark Raph: a Kanabo clone of Raph. (3 episodes)
 Wayne Grayson as Dark Mikey: a Kanabo clone of Mikey (3 episodes)

Guest
 Veronica Taylor as April O'Neil: an ally of the Turtles who enters a relationship with Casey Jones.
 Marc Thompson as Casey Jones: an ally of the Turtles who enters a relationship with April O'Neil.
 Scottie Ray as Ch'rell / The Utrom Shredder: the leader of the Foot Clan who appears in "Clash of the Turtle Titans" and "Timing is Everything" before his banishing in "Exodus, Part 2."
 Scott Williams as Baxter Stockman: a brilliant scientist who survived to the year 2105.

Crew
Teenage Mutant Ninja Turtles: Fast Forward was produced by Mirage Studios & 4Kids Entertainment and was aired on Fox's Saturday morning kids' block in the US. The producers were Gary Richardson, Frederick U. Fierst, and Joellyn Marlow for the American team; Tae Ho Han was the producer for the Korean team.

Reception
Unlike the previous seasons, the fast forward season had mixed to somewhat negative reviews. The main reason was for its storyline change, brighter, sillier tone and the art style change. As of November 2007, it had 1.36 million views and has a rank of 76%.

Episodes

Unproduced episodes
An additional set of 10 episodes was originally in production and intended to be aired on 4Kids TV in Fall 2007. However, the episodes were scrapped mid-production and only a storyboard animatic of one of the episodes ("Master Fighter 2105") was released through the Rewards Plaza of the 4Kids website.

References

External links

Season Six Episode list with detailed synopses at the Official Ninja Turtles website

2006 American television seasons
2007 American television seasons
2000s American time travel television series
Season 6
Television series set in the 22nd century
Television series about the Moon
American time travel television series